The Snow on the Pines  is a 2012 Iranian black and white film written and directed by Iranian-American director and actor Peyman Moaadi.

The Snow on the pines is Moaadi's debut as a director. Also, it won a Crystal simorgh in the Fajr International Film Festival.

Story 
A woman who is a piano teacher deals with an important moment in her life and meets the dilemma of the decision. She has to choose in a common way, and/or find a different way.

Awards 
Crystal simorghs:

 Crystal simorgh; for the best film chosen by audiences. the 30th Fajr International Film Festival.
 Appreciation prize; for the best actress (Mahnaz Afshar) New look section. the 30th Fajr International Film Festival.

Awards for Moaadi

References

External links

2012 films
Persian cinema articles needing an image
2012 directorial debut films
Iranian black-and-white films
Crystal Simorgh for Audience Choice of Best Film winners